Mariana Matthews (born 1946) is a Chilean photographer, curator, and visual artist whose technique is mainly based on the use of documentary photography, contemporary art, and experimental art.

Biography
Mariana Matthews graduated with a Bachelor of Arts at American University, and earned a postgraduate degree in Photography at Ohio University. She is considered one of the forerunners of so-called patrimonial photography, while the use of mixed techniques predominates in her work, mainly based on black and white photography and the inclusion of color as appropriate within such images.

Exhibitions and distinctions

In 2000 and 2003 she received the Altazor Award for National Arts in the Photography category for Adoremos and Ojo de Agua respectively.

Publications
 Los testigos y sus huellas: fotógrafos del Sur de Chile, Valck, Provoste, Sandoval (Valdivia: Corporación Municipal Cultural Valdivia, 2008)
 Casas del Sur de Chile (Valdivia: El Kultrún, 2002)
 Fragmentos de una memoria 1858–2000: fotografía en la Región de Los Lagos (Valdivia: El Kultrún, 2001)
 Valdivia en madera y metal (Valdivia: El Kultrún, 1993)

As editor
 Los fabulosos Valck (2005) together with Margarita Alvarado

References

1946 births
21st-century photographers
American University alumni
Artists from Santiago
Chilean art curators
Chilean photographers
Chilean women artists
Documentary photographers
Living people
Ohio University alumni
Chilean women curators
21st-century women photographers
Photography curators
Women photojournalists